Roy Harris (1898–1979) was an American classical composer.

Roy Harris may also refer to:
Roy V. Harris (1895–1985), American politician, member of the Georgia House of Representatives and the Georgia State Senate
Roy Harris (British Army soldier) (1902–1973), British recipient of the George Cross in World War II
Roy J. Harris (1902–1980), American journalist
Roy Harris (linguist) (1931–2015), British linguist and founder of integrationism
Roy Harris (boxer) (born 1933), American heavyweight boxer
Roy Harris (folk singer) (1933–2016), British folk singer
Roy J. Harris Jr. (born 1946), newspaper reporter and editor